Kamiel De Graeve (born 4 August 1906, date of death unknown) was a Belgian racing cyclist. He rode in the 1933 Tour de France.

References

1906 births
Year of death missing
Belgian male cyclists
Place of birth missing